Grocio Prado District is one of eleven districts of the province Chincha in Peru.

References

1914 establishments in Peru